"I'm Waiting for the Day" is a song by the American rock band the Beach Boys from their 1966 album Pet Sounds. Written primarily by Brian Wilson, the lyrics describe a man who is "waiting for the day" when the woman he loves will be ready to commit to a relationship with him. Wilson, alongside co-author Mike Love, are the only Beach Boys who appear on the recording.

Musically, the arrangement is characterized for its dynamic use of textures and word painting. Wilson produced the track in March 1966 with the aid of 17 studio musicians who variously played timpani, bongos, drums, flutes, English horn, electric guitar, two basses, strings, and an altered tack piano.

Background and lyrics

"I'm Waiting for the Day" was copyrighted by Wilson as a solo composition in February 1964. When the song was published on Pet Sounds, it was credited to Wilson and Mike Love, who revised eight words in Wilson's original lyric. Asked in 2014 about the song, Wilson said that "there really was no specific inspiration".

The song is a simple love poem whose narrator wishes to offer his comfort and support to a girl who was abandoned by her former lover. The narrator feels that she is "the only one" for him, and that he holds the power to "set [her] broken heart free". However, the broken-hearted girl is reluctant to commit herself to another relationship, leading the narrator to pledge, "I'm waiting for the day when you can love again". Biographer Peter Ames Carlin summarizes the song as a "relatively hard-rocking" tune about "love's restorative power". Musicologist James Perone notes, 

It is one of the five (of 13) tracks on the LP that Wilson did not write in conjunction with lyricist Tony Asher. In his 2003 book about Pet Sounds, Charles Granata refers to "I'm Waiting for the Day" as a "a sensational reminder of the smart songs" Love had co-authored with Wilson on the 1965 album The Beach Boys Today!.

Composition

"I'm Waiting for the Day" has a verse-refrain structure and AAAB form. It is in the key of E major, and is one of only five tracks on Pet Sounds that does not modulate or waver into other keys. Although slower in the choruses, the verses contain the fastest tempos heard on the album (approximately 168 beats per minute). According to Granata, the song serves as another example of Wilson's use of "metaphoric instrumentation", this time to bolster the themes of "commitment and strength" elaborated in the lyrics. 

The song opens and ends with the heavy sounds of a timpani being struck, which reduces in intensity during other sections. Lambert says that the timpani is evocative of "a throbbing, aching heart" and is "soon joined by other instruments and a brief statement of an inverted arch figure in the flute" which recurs later in the piece. In the verses, the lead vocal melody is doubled by an English horn. In Granata's belief, this English horn amplifies the song's restless feeling by suggesting "a sense of longing when voiced behind Brian's lead vocal ('I came along when he broke your heart'), and resignation in the final chorus ('I'm waiting for the day when you can love again')."

Chord-wise, the changes in the verses are essentially a doo-wop progression that gives way to the same progression Wilson had previously used in "The Man with All the Toys" (1964).

The second verse introduces backing vocals singing the same melody that the flutes play in the intro. Bruce Johnston alluded to the nonsense-syllable bass vocals, a part of the backing harmonies, as an example of the "tremendous amount of doo-wop and R&B influence sprinkled throughout Pet Sounds." Of this song, he said that there are "beautiful, dumb background parts. The yin-yang works great there. The 'doops' and the 'aahs.' It's kind of like having all the scruffy characters that are in [the musical] Oliver show up at the Royal Albert Hall. They don't belong but it fits." 

Preceding the final chorus is a sudden short interlude featuring just a string section as accompaniment. Granata compares the section to the previous track, "Don't Talk (Put Your Head on My Shoulder)", which similarly emphasizes the stringed instruments' lower register. He writes, "In this seven-second passage we glimpse Brian's refined musical sense, and his predilection for taking us by surprise. Here, the theme is arbitrary—it isn't voiced anywhere else in the song. In this short section, the string ensemble sweeps through an interesting sequence of 10 chords, none of which repeat." Lambert characterizes those chords as "intensely chromatic" with "internal moving lines of extraordinary intricacy". 

Carol Kaye, who played 12-string electric guitar on the track, commented of the bass line, "[That] part with the 4th (sus 11th) on the bottom. Very rare! Brian really stretched his orchestrating there, but it's fine. This was a little boring to play without a lead...sort of like Beethoven, the bass wound up playing scale-like figures to a march time, ending a jazz-like chordal spread of violin and cellos."

Recording

Wilson produced the basic track, including string overdubs, on March 6, 1966 at Western Recorders Studio 3. The song was then logged as "Untitled Ballad". Vocal overdubs finished the track on March 10 (or possibly March 10–12) at Columbia Studio A. Wilson and Love, who both sang vocals, are the only Beach Boys who perform on the recording. A discarded alternate mix, created on March 12, featured only Love on lead vocals.

Critical reception
On May 16, 1966, "I'm Waiting for the Day" was released as the fifth track on Pet Sounds. In his self-described "unbiased" review of the album for Record Mirror, Norman Jopling described the song as an exhibition for "shotgun drums ... strings and organ, but used completely different [from 'Don't Talk'] ... it suddenly develops into a thumpy heartbeating noise, which is the introduction for Brian Wilson to throw in everything including the proverbial kitchen sink, and presumably the washing up water..."

Wilson felt that his singing on "I'm Waiting for the Day" was inadequate, explaining, "Vocally, I thought I sounded a little bit weird in my head. That's the one cut off the album I didn't really like that much. But, you know, it's okay, it's not a case of liking or not liking it; it was an appropriate song, a very, very positive song. I just didn't like my voice on that particular song." His brother Carl praised the dynamics, saying, "The intro is very big, then it gets quite small with the vocal in the verse with a little instrumentation and then, in the chorus, it gets very big again, with the background harmonies against the lead. It is perhaps one of the most dynamic moments in the album."

Live performances
In 1974 and 1975, the Beach Boys incorporated "I'm Waiting for the Day" in their concert set lists.

Personnel

Per band archivist Craig Slowinski.

The Beach Boys
 Mike Love – bass and backing vocals
 Brian Wilson – lead and bass vocals

Session musicians (also known as "the Wrecking Crew")

 Gary Coleman – timpani, bongos
 Jim Gordon – drums
 Bill Green – flute
 Leonard Hartman – English horn
 Jim Horn – flute
 Carol Kaye – 12-string electric guitar
 Larry Knechtel – Hammond B3 organ
 Al de Lory – upright tack piano with taped strings
 Jay Migliori – flute
 Ray Pohlman – electric bass guitar
 Lyle Ritz – upright bass, overdubbed arco upright bass

The Sid Sharp Strings

 Justin DiTullio – cello
 Harry Hyams – viola
 William Kurasch – violin
 Leonard Malarsky – violin
 Ralph Schaeffer – violin
 Sid Sharp – violin

Cover versions

1966 – Peanut, 7" single (arranged/produced by Mark Wirtz)
1998 – Short Hair Front, Smiling Pets
2001 – Reigning Sound, Break Up, Break Down
2002 – Brian Wilson, Pet Sounds Live

Notes

References

Bibliography

External links
 
 

1966 songs
The Beach Boys songs
Pop ballads
Songs written by Brian Wilson
Songs written by Mike Love
Song recordings produced by Brian Wilson
Song recordings with Wall of Sound arrangements